Basic lead acetate, also known as subacetate of lead, is the inorganic compound with the formula Pb3(OH)4(O2CCH3)2.  A white solid, it is one of several lead acetates.

History
Goulard's extract  is a solution of lead(II) acetate and lead(II) oxide used as an astringent during the 18th, 19th and early 20th centuries. It was named after its introducer, Thomas Goulard. Lead poisoning and the development of more effective astringents caused doctors to abandon its use.  Synonymous or very closely related formulations were known as liquor plumbi subacetis dilutus, eau de Goulard, extract of Saturn, vinegar of Saturn, and liquid acetate of lead.  The white water eau de Saturne differed from eau de Goulard in not containing alcohol, but was often confused with it. Goulard's Extract was a primary ingredient in both Goulard's Cerate and Goulard's Water.

References

History of pharmacy
Lead(II) compounds